Tarun Kumar (born 8 January 1983
) is an Indian actor known for his works predominantly in Telugu cinema. He has also appeared in few Tamil and Malayalam films. He has received three state Nandi Awards and the National Film Award for his works. He received the National Film Award for Best Child Artist in 1991, for his work in Mani Ratnam's Anjali, which was India's official entry to the Oscars for that year. Tarun won critical acclaim with the Malayalam children's film, Abhayam (1991), which won the National Film Award for Best Children's Film for that year, and Tarun won the Best Child artist Award at the Furoshiki Film Festival in Japan. As a child artist, Tarun starred in super hits such as Manasu Mamatha (1990), Surya IPS (1991), Aditya 369 (1991),  Teja (1992), My Dear Muthachan (1992), and Johny (1993).

Early life
Tarun is the son of Roja Ramani and Odia Director Sushant Chakrapani. He started his career as a child actor with Manasu Mamatha (1990).

Career as lead actor 
After a seven-year break, Tarun was the lead actor in the big blockbuster Nuvve Kavali in 2000, which won the National Film Award for Best Feature Film in Telugu for that year, and Tarun won the Filmfare Award for Best Male Debut – South for his work in the film. Some of his films include Priyamaina Neeku (2001), Nuvvu Leka Nenu Lenu (2002), Nuvve Nuvve (2002), Punnagai Desam (2002) (Tamil), Ninne Istapaddanu (2003), Ela Cheppanu (2003), Nee Manasu Naaku Telusu (2003), Sakhiya (2004), Bhale Dongalu (2008), Sasirekha Parinayam (2009), Chukkalanti Ammayi Chakkanaina Abbayi (2013), Yuddham (2014), and Idhi Naa Love Story (2018).

Non-film work
Tarun is an accomplished cricketer and participates in Indian Celebrity Cricket League. He is the brand ambassador of Medak Mavericks team of Telangana T20 League cricket.

Filmography
Actor

Dubbing artist

References

Living people
1983 births
Male actors from Hyderabad, India
Telugu people
People from Odisha
Filmfare Awards South winners
Nandi Award winners
Male actors in Tamil cinema
Businesspeople from Hyderabad, India
Indian male child actors
Male actors in Telugu cinema
Indian male film actors
Male actors in Malayalam cinema
20th-century Indian male actors
21st-century Indian male actors
Best Child Artist National Film Award winners